The soundtrack for the 2021 American superhero film Shang-Chi and the Legend of the Ten Rings, based on the Marvel Comics character Shang-Chi and produced by Marvel Studios, consists of an original score composed by Joel P. West and a soundtrack album on which Sean Miyashiro and 88rising serve as executive producers that features original songs performed by various artists. The film score was released by Marvel Music and Hollywood Records on September 1, 2021, while the soundtrack album was released by Marvel Music, Hollywood Records, and Interscope Records on September 3, 2021, with four singles from the soundtrack released in August 2021.

Shang-Chi and the Legend of the Ten Rings (Original Score)
Recording for the film's score, composed by Joel P. West, began at Abbey Road Studios in London by June 2021. West scored director Destin Daniel Cretton's four previous films. The original score for the film was released by Marvel Music and Hollywood Records on September 1, 2021.

Track listing

Shang-Chi and the Legend of the Ten Rings: The Album

Two singles from the film's soundtrack, "Lazy Susan" by 21 Savage and Rich Brian (featuring Warren Hue and MaSiWei) and "Every Summertime" by Niki, were released on August 10, 2021 by Marvel Music, Hollywood Records, and Interscope Records. A third single from the soundtrack, "Run It" by DJ Snake, Rick Ross, and Brian, was featured in a promotional spot for the film on August 12, and was released the following day. The track was also used as the "anthem" for ESPN's 2021-2022 college football coverage. A fourth single titled "In the Dark" by Swae Lee and featuring Jhené Aiko was released on August 20. A soundtrack album containing these songs was released on September 3, executive produced by Sean Miyashiro and 88rising.

Track listing

Charts

Additional music 
"Hotel California" by the Eagles is featured in the film's mid-credits scene, but is not included in either soundtrack album.

References

2021 soundtrack albums
2020s film soundtrack albums
Interscope Records soundtracks
Marvel Cinematic Universe: Phase Four soundtracks
Shang-Chi and the Legend of the Ten Rings
Hollywood Records compilation albums
Marvel Music compilation albums
Albums produced by Jam City